Plenckia is a genus of flowering plants belonging to the family Celastraceae.

It is native to Bolivia, Brazil, Paraguay and north-western Argentina.
 
The genus name of Plenckia is in honour of Joseph Jakob Plenck (1735–1807), an Austrian physician and polymath. He is now known as a pioneer dermatologist. 
It was first described and published in C.F.P.von Martius & auct. suc. (eds.), Fl. Bras. Vol.11 (Issue 1) on page 30 in 1861.

Known species
According to Kew:
Plenckia integerrima 
Plenckia microcarpa 
Plenckia populnea

References

Celastraceae
Celastrales genera
Plants described in 1861
Flora of Bolivia
Flora of Brazil
Flora of Paraguay
Flora of Northwest Argentina